Jackie Chan Adventures is an animated television series chronicling the adventures of a fictionalized version of action film star Jackie Chan. This series ran on Kids' WB from September 9, 2000, to July 8, 2005, for a total of 95 episodes, and had 5 seasons. During its run, it was also shown on Cartoon Network, and afterwards its reruns landed on Toon Disney's Jetix block. An Arabic translation has been airing on MBC 3 since early 2006. There have been several toys and video games based on the series. The series ended on July 8, 2005, just five episodes away from its 100th.

Series overview

Episodes

Season 1 (2000–01)

Season 2 (2001–02)

Season 3 (2002–03)

Season 4 (2003–04)

Season 5 (2004–05)

See also 
 List of Jackie Chan Adventures characters

References

External links 
 

Jackie Chan

fr:Jackie Chan (série télévisée d'animation)#Épisodes